Gerard Barrett (born 31 December 1956) is an Australian former long-distance runner who competed in the 1980 Summer Olympics.

References

1956 births
Living people
Australian male long-distance runners
Olympic athletes of Australia
Athletes (track and field) at the 1980 Summer Olympics